

Events

Pre-1600
490 BC – Battle of Marathon: The conventionally accepted date for the Battle of Marathon. The Athenians and their Plataean allies defeat the first Persian invasion force of Greece.
 372 – Sixteen Kingdoms: Jin Xiaowudi, age 10, succeeds his father Jin Jianwendi as Emperor of the Eastern Jin dynasty.
1213 – Albigensian Crusade: Simon de Montfort, 5th Earl of Leicester, defeats Peter II of Aragon at the Battle of Muret.
1229 – Battle of Portopí: The Aragonese army under the command of James I of Aragon disembarks at Santa Ponça, Majorca, with the purpose of conquering the island.
1309 – The First Siege of Gibraltar takes place in the context of the Spanish Reconquista pitting the forces of the Kingdom of Castile against the Emirate of Granada resulting in a Castilian victory.

1601–1900
1609 – Henry Hudson begins his exploration of the Hudson River while aboard the Halve Maen.
1634 – A gunpowder factory explodes in Valletta, Malta, killing 22 people and damaging several buildings.
1683 – Austro-Ottoman War: Battle of Vienna: Several European armies join forces to defeat the Ottoman Empire.
1762 – The Sultanate of Sulu ceded Balambangan Island to the British East India Company
1814 – Battle of North Point: an American detachment halts the British land advance to Baltimore in the War of 1812.
1846 – Elizabeth Barrett elopes with Robert Browning.
1847 – Mexican–American War: the Battle of Chapultepec begins.
1848 – A new constitution marks the establishment of Switzerland as a federal state.
1857 – The  sinks about 160 miles east of Cape Hatteras, North Carolina, drowning a total of 426 passengers and crew, including Captain William Lewis Herndon. The ship was carrying 13–15 tons of gold from the California Gold Rush.
1885 – Arbroath 36–0 Bon Accord, a world record scoreline in professional Association football.
1890 – Salisbury, Rhodesia, is founded.
1897 – Tirah Campaign: In the Battle of Saragarhi, ten thousand Pashtun tribesmen suffer several hundred casualties while attacking 21 Sikh soldiers in British service.

1901–present
1906 – The Newport Transporter Bridge is opened in Newport, South Wales by Viscount Tredegar.
1910 – Premiere performance of Gustav Mahler's Symphony No. 8 in Munich (with a chorus of 852 singers and an orchestra of 171 players. Mahler's rehearsal assistant conductor was Bruno Walter).
1915 – French soldiers rescue over 4,000 Armenian genocide survivors stranded on Musa Dagh.
1923 – Southern Rhodesia, today called Zimbabwe, is annexed by the United Kingdom.
1933 – Leó Szilárd, waiting for a red light on Southampton Row in Bloomsbury, conceives the idea of the nuclear chain reaction.
1938 – Adolf Hitler demands autonomy and self-determination for the Germans of the Sudetenland region of Czechoslovakia.
1940 – Cave paintings are discovered in Lascaux, France.
  1940   – The Hercules Powder Plant Disaster in the United States kills 51 people and injures over 200.
1942 – World War II: RMS Laconia, carrying civilians, Allied soldiers and Italian POWs is torpedoed off the coast of West Africa and sinks with a heavy loss of life.
  1942   – World War II: First day of the Battle of Edson's Ridge during the Guadalcanal Campaign. U.S. Marines protecting Henderson Field are attacked by Imperial Japanese Army troops.
1943 – World War II: Benito Mussolini is rescued from house arrest by German commando forces led by Otto Skorzeny.
1944 – World War II: The liberation of Yugoslavia from Axis occupation continues. Bajina Bašta in western Serbia is among the liberated cities.
1945 – The People's Republic of Korea is proclaimed, bringing an end to Japanese rule over Korea.
1948 – Chinese Civil War: Marshal Lin Biao, commander-in-chief of the Chinese communist Northeast Field Army, launched a massive offensive toward Jinzhou, Liaoshen Campaign has begun.
1953 – U.S. Senator and future President John Fitzgerald Kennedy marries Jacqueline Lee Bouvier at St. Mary's Church in Newport, Rhode Island.
1958 – Jack Kilby demonstrates the first working integrated circuit while working at Texas Instruments.
1959 – The Soviet Union launches a large rocket, Lunik II, at the Moon.
  1959   – Bonanza premieres, the first regularly scheduled TV program presented in color.
1961 – The African and Malagasy Union is founded.
  1961   – Air France Flight 2005 crashes near Rabat–Salé Airport, in Rabat, Morocco, killing 77 people.
1962 – President John F. Kennedy delivers his "We choose to go to the Moon" speech at Rice University.
1966 – Gemini 11, the penultimate mission of NASA's Gemini program, and the current human altitude record holder (except for the Apollo lunar missions).
1969 – Philippine Airlines Flight 158 crashes in Antipolo, near Manila International Airport in the Philippines, killing 45 people.
1970 – Dawson's Field hijackings: Popular Front for the Liberation of Palestine terrorists blow up three hijacked airliners in Zarqa, Jordan, continuing to hold the passengers hostage in various undisclosed locations in Amman.
1974 – Emperor Haile Selassie of Ethiopia, 'Messiah' of the Rastafari movement, is deposed following a military coup by the Derg, ending a reign of 58 years.
1977 – South African anti-apartheid activist Steve Biko dies in police custody.
1980 – The 43rd government of Turkey is overthrown in a coup d'état led by General Kenan Evren.
1983 – A Wells Fargo depot in West Hartford, Connecticut, United States, is robbed of approximately US$7 million by Los Macheteros.
  1983   – The USSR vetoes a United Nations Security Council Resolution deploring the Soviet destruction of Korean Air Lines Flight 007.
1984 – Dwight Gooden sets the baseball record for strikeouts in a season by a rookie with 276, previously set by Herb Score with 246 in 1954. Gooden's 276 strikeouts that season, pitched in 218 innings, set the current record.
1988 – Hurricane Gilbert devastates Jamaica; it turns towards Mexico's Yucatán Peninsula two days later, causing an estimated $5 billion in damage.
1990 – The two German states and the Four Powers sign the Treaty on the Final Settlement with Respect to Germany in Moscow, paving the way for German reunification.
  1990   – The Red Cross organizations of mainland China and Taiwan sign Kinmen Agreement on repatriation of illegal immigrants and criminal suspects after two days of talks in Kinmen, Fujian Province in response to the two tragedies in repatriation in the previous two months. It is the first agreement reached by private organizations across the Taiwan Strait.
1992 – NASA launches Space Shuttle Endeavour on STS-47 which marked the 50th shuttle mission. On board are Mae Carol Jemison, the first African-American woman in space, Mamoru Mohri, the first Japanese citizen to fly in a US spaceship, and Mark Lee and Jan Davis, the first married couple in space.
  1992   – Abimael Guzmán, leader of the Shining Path, is captured by Peruvian special forces; shortly thereafter the rest of Shining Path's leadership fell as well.
1994 – Frank Eugene Corder fatally crashes a single-engine Cessna 150 into the White House's south lawn, striking the West wing. There were no other casualties. 
2001 – Ansett Australia, Australia's first commercial interstate airline, collapses due to increased strain on the international airline industry, leaving 10,000 people unemployed.
2003 – The United Nations lifts sanctions against Libya after that country agreed to accept responsibility and recompense the families of victims in the 1988 bombing of Pan Am Flight 103.
  2003   – Iraq War: In Fallujah, U.S. forces mistakenly shoot and kill eight Iraqi police officers.
  2003   – Typhoon Maemi, the strongest recorded typhoon to strike South Korea, made landfall near Busan.
2005 – Israeli-Palestinian conflict: the Israeli disengagement from Gaza is completed, leaving some 2,530 homes demolished.
2007 – Former Philippine President Joseph Estrada is convicted of plunder.
  2007   – Two earthquakes measuring 8.4 and 7.9 on the Richter Scale hits the Indonesian island of Sumatra, killing 25 people and injuring 161.
2008 – The 2008 Chatsworth train collision in Los Angeles between a Metrolink commuter train and a Union Pacific freight train kills 25 people.
2011 – The National September 11 Memorial & Museum in New York City opens to the public.
2013 – NASA confirms that its Voyager 1 probe has become the first manmade object to enter interstellar space. 
2015 – A series of explosions involving propane triggering nearby illegally stored mining detonators in the Indian town of Petlawad in the state of Madhya Pradesh kills at least 105 people with over 150 injured.

Births

Pre-1600
1415 – John de Mowbray, 3rd Duke of Norfolk (d. 1461)
1494 – Francis I of France (d. 1547)
1590 – María de Zayas, Spanish writer (d. 1661)

1601–1900
1605 – William Dugdale, English genealogist and historian (d. 1686)
1690 – Peter Dens, Flemish theologian and academic (d. 1775)
1725 – Guillaume Le Gentil, French astronomer (d. 1792)
1736 – Hsinbyushin, Burmese king (d. 1776)
1739 – Mary Bosanquet Fletcher, Methodist preacher and philanthropist (d. 1815)
1740 – Johann Heinrich Jung, German author and academic (d. 1817)
1768 – Benjamin Carr, English-American singer-songwriter, educator, and publisher (d. 1831)
1797 – Samuel Joseph May, American activist (d. 1871)
1812 – Edward Shepherd Creasy, English historian and jurist (d. 1878)
  1812   – Richard March Hoe, American engineer and businessman, invented the Rotary printing press (d. 1886)
1818 – Richard Jordan Gatling, American inventor, invented the Gatling gun (d. 1903)
  1818   – Theodor Kullak, German pianist, composer, and educator (d. 1882)
1828 – William Morgan, English-Australian politician, 14th Premier of South Australia (d. 1883)
1829 – Anselm Feuerbach, German painter (d. 1880)
  1829   – Charles Dudley Warner, American essayist and novelist (d. 1900)
1830 – William Sprague, American businessman and politician, 27th Governor of Rhode Island (d. 1915)
1837 – Louis IV, Grand Duke of Hesse (d. 1892)
1852 – H. H. Asquith, English lawyer and politician, Prime Minister of the United Kingdom (d. 1928)
1855 – Simon-Napoléon Parent, Canadian lawyer and politician, 12th Premier of Quebec (d. 1920)
1856 – Johann Heinrich Beck, American composer and conductor (d. 1924)
1857 – Manuel Espinosa Batista, Colombian pharmacist and politician (d. 1919)
1862 – Carl Eytel, German-American painter and illustrator (d. 1925)
1866 – Freeman Freeman-Thomas, 1st Marquess of Willingdon, English cricketer and politician, 13th Governor General of Canada (d. 1941)
1869 – Paweł Owerłło, Polish actor (d. 1957)
1875 – Matsunosuke Onoe, Japanese actor and director (d. 1926)
1880 – H. L. Mencken, American journalist and critic (d. 1956)
1882 – Ion Agârbiceanu, Romanian journalist, politician, and archbishop (d. 1963)
1884 – Martin Klein, Estonian wrestler and coach (d. 1947)
1885 – Heinrich Hoffmann, German photographer and art dealer (d. 1957)
1888 – Maurice Chevalier, French actor, singer, and dancer (d. 1972)
1889 – Ugo Pasquale Mifsud, Maltese politician, 3rd Prime Minister of Malta (d. 1942)
1891 – Pedro Albizu Campos, Puerto Rican lawyer and politician (d. 1965)
  1891   – Jean-François Martial, Belgian actor (d. 1977)
  1891   – Arthur Hays Sulzberger, American publisher (d. 1968)
1892 – Alfred A. Knopf, Sr., American publisher, founded Alfred A. Knopf Inc. (d. 1984)
1894 – Kyuichi Tokuda, Japanese lawyer and politician (d. 1953)
  1894   – Dorothy Maud Wrinch, Argentinian-English mathematician, biochemist and philosopher (d. 1976)
1895 – Freymóður Jóhannsson, Icelandic painter and composer (d. 1973)
1897 – Irène Joliot-Curie, French chemist and physicist, Nobel Prize laureate (d. 1956)
  1897   – Walter B. Gibson, American magician and author (d. 1985)
1898 – Salvador Bacarisse, Spanish composer (d. 1963)
  1898   – Alma Moodie, Australian violinist and educator (d. 1943)
  1898   – Ben Shahn, Lithuanian-American painter and photographer (d. 1969)
1900 – Haskell Curry, American mathematician, logician, and academic (d. 1982)

1901–present
1901 – Shmuel Horowitz, Israeli agronomist and academic (d. 1999)
1902 – Juscelino Kubitschek, Brazilian physician and politician, 21st President of Brazil (d. 1976)
  1902   – Marya Zaturenska, Ukrainian-American poet and author (d. 1982)
1904 – István Horthy, Hungarian fighter pilot and deputy regent (d. 1942)
  1904   – John Courtney Murray, American priest and theologian (d. 1967)
  1904   – Lou Moore, American race car driver (d. 1956)
1905 – Linda Agostini, English-Australian murder victim (d. 1934)
1907 – Louis MacNeice, Irish poet and playwright (d. 1963)
1908 – Werner Flume, German jurist (d. 2009)
1909 – Donald MacDonald, Canadian trade union leader and politician (d. 1986)
1913 – Jesse Owens, American sprinter and long jumper (d. 1980)
1914 – Rais Amrohvi, Pakistani psychoanalyst, poet, and scholar (d. 1988)
  1914   – Desmond Llewelyn, Welsh-English soldier and actor (d. 1999)
1916 – Tony Bettenhausen, American race car driver (d. 1961)
1917 – Pierre Sévigny, Canadian colonel, academic, and politician (d. 2004)
  1917   – Han Suyin, Chinese-Swiss physician and author (d. 2012)
1920 – Irene Dailey, American actress (d. 2008)
1921 – Frank McGee, American journalist (d. 1974)
  1921   – Stanisław Lem, Polish philosopher and author (d. 2006)
  1921   – Turgut Cansever, Turkish architect, city planner, and thinker (d. 2009)
1922 – Antonio Cafiero, Argentinian accountant and politician, Governor of Buenos Aires Province (d. 2014)
  1922   – Jackson Mac Low, American poet, playwright, and composer (d. 2004)
  1922   – Mark Rosenzweig, American psychologist and academic (d. 2009)
1924 – Amílcar Cabral, Guinea-Bissauan political leader (d. 1973)
1925 – Stan Lopata, American baseball player (d. 2013)
  1925   – Dickie Moore, American actor (d. 2015)
1927 – Mathé Altéry, French soprano and actress
1928 – Robert Irwin, American painter and gardener
  1928   – Muriel Siebert, American businesswoman and philanthropist (d. 2013)
  1928   – Ernie Vandeweghe, Canadian-American basketball player and physician (d. 2014)
1929 – Harvey Schmidt, American composer and illustrator (d. 2018)
1930 – Larry Austin, American composer and educator
1931 – Ian Holm, English actor (d. 2020)
  1931   – George Jones, American singer-songwriter and guitarist (d. 2013)
1932 – Atli Dam, Faroese engineer and politician, 5th Prime Minister of the Faroe Islands (d. 2005)
1934 – Glenn Davis, American hurdler, sprinter, and football player (d. 2009)
  1934   – Jaegwon Kim, South Korean-American philosopher and academic (d. 2019)
  1934   – Nellie Wong, Chinese American poet and activist
1935 – Richard Hunt, American sculptor
1937 – George Chuvalo, Canadian boxer
  1937   – Wes Hall, Barbadian cricketer and politician
1938 – Judy Clay, American soul and gospel singer (d. 2001)
  1938   – Claude Ruel, Canadian ice hockey player and coach (d. 2015)
  1938   – Tatiana Troyanos, American operatic soprano (d. 1993)
1939 – Pablo McNeil, Jamaican track and field sprinter and sprinting coach (d. 2011)
  1939   – Phillip Ramey, American pianist and composer
  1939   – Henry Waxman, American lawyer and politician
1940 – Linda Gray, American model and actress
1942 – Michel Drucker, French journalist
  1942   – Tomás Marco, Spanish composer
  1942   – François Tavenas, Canadian engineer and academic (d. 2004)
1943 – Maria Muldaur, American folk and blues singer
  1943   – Leonard Peltier, American political activist and convicted criminal
1944 – Lonnie Mayne, American wrestler (d. 1978)
  1944   – Vladimir Spivakov, Russian violinist and conductor
  1944   – Barry White, American singer-songwriter (d. 2003)
1945 – Russell "Jungle Jim" Liberman, American drag racer (d. 1977)
  1945   – Milo Manara, Italian author and illustrator
  1945   – John Mauceri, American conductor and producer
1946 – Tony Bellamy, American singer-songwriter and guitarist (d. 2009)
  1946   – Neil Lyndon, British journalist and writer
1947 – David Grant, English engineer and academic
  1947   – Gerald Howarth, English soldier, pilot, and politician, Minister for International Security Strategy
  1947   – Christopher Neame, English actor
1948 – Steve Turre, American trombonist and educator
  1948   – Max Walker, Australian footballer, cricketer, sportscaster, and architect (d. 2016)
  1948   – Caio Fernando Abreu, Brazilian writer (d. 1996)
1949 – Charles Burlingame, American captain and pilot (d. 2001)
  1949   – Irina Rodnina, Russian figure skater and politician
  1949   – Tony Stevens, English rock bassist and songwriter
1950 – Marguerite Blais, Canadian journalist and politician
  1950   – Gustav Brunner, Austrian engineer
  1950   – Bruce Mahler, American actor and screenwriter
  1950   – Mike Murphy, Canadian ice hockey player and coach
1951 – Bertie Ahern, Irish accountant and politician, 11th Taoiseach of Ireland
  1951   – Norm Dubé, Canadian ice hockey player
  1951   – Ray Gravell, Welsh rugby player and actor (d. 2007)
  1951   – Joe Pantoliano, American actor and producer
  1951   – Ali-Ollie Woodson, American singer-songwriter and keyboard player (d. 2010)
1952 – Gerry Beckley, American singer-songwriter and guitarist
  1952   – Neil Peart, Canadian drummer, songwriter, and producer (d. 2020)
1953 – Nan Goldin, American photographer
1954 – Robert Gober, American sculptor
  1954   – Scott Hamilton, American saxophonist
  1954   – Peeter Volkonski, Estonian singer-songwriter and actor
1955 – Brian Smith, English footballer (d. 2013)
1956 – Barry Andrews, English singer and keyboard player
  1956   – Leslie Cheung, Hong Kong singer-songwriter and actor (d. 2003)
  1956   – David Goodhart, English journalist and author
  1956   – Walter Woon, Singaporean lawyer and politician, 7th Attorney-General of Singapore
1957 – Paul M. Sharp, British academic and educator
  1957   – Jan Egeland, Norwegian politician, diplomat and humanitarian
  1957   – Rachel Ward, English-Australian actress
  1957   – Hans Zimmer, German composer and producer
1958 – Wilfred Benítez, American boxer
  1958   – Gregg Edelman, American actor and singer
1959 – Scott Brown, American colonel and politician
  1959   – Deron Cherry, American football player and sportscaster
  1959   – Sigmar Gabriel, German educator and politician, 17th Vice-Chancellor of Germany
1960 – Evan Jenkins, American academic and politician
  1960   – Stefanos Korkolis, Greek pianist and composer
1961 – Mylène Farmer, Canadian-French singer-songwriter, producer, and actress
1962 – Sunay Akın, Turkish poet, journalist, and philanthropist
  1962   – Amy Yasbeck, American actress
1964 – Greg Gutfeld, American television journalist and author
  1964   – Dieter Hecking, German footballer and manager
1965 – Einstein Kristiansen, Norwegian animator and producer
  1965   – Vernon Maxwell, American basketball player
  1965   – Midnight, Jamaican wrestler
1966 – Ben Folds, American singer-songwriter, guitarist, and producer
  1966   – Vezio Sacratini, Canadian ice hockey player
1967 – Louis C.K., American comedian, actor, producer, and screenwriter
  1967   – Pat Listach, American baseball player, coach, and manager
1968 – Larry LaLonde, American guitarist and songwriter
  1968   – Nicholas Russell, 6th Earl Russell, English politician (d. 2014)
  1968   – Richard Snell, South African cricketer and physiotherapist
  1968   – Paul F. Tompkins, American comedian, actor, and writer
1969 – Max Boot, Russian-American historian and author
  1969   – Ángel Cabrera, Argentinian golfer
  1969   – James Frey, American author and screenwriter
  1969   – Shigeki Maruyama, Japanese golfer
1970 – Nathan Larson, American singer-songwriter and guitarist 
1971 – Younes El Aynaoui, Moroccan tennis player
  1971   – Shocker, Mexican wrestler
1972 – Gideon Emery, English-American actor, producer, and screenwriter
  1972   – Paul Green, Australian rugby league player and coach (d. 2022)
  1972   – Sidney Souza, Brazilian footballer
1973 – Tarana Burke, American civil rights activist 
  1973   – Kara David, Filipino journalist and documentarian
  1973   – Martina Ertl-Renz, German skier
  1973   – Martin Lapointe, Canadian ice hockey player and coach
  1973   – Paul Walker, American actor (d. 2013)
1974 – Caroline Aigle, French soldier and pilot (d. 2007)
  1974   – Jennifer Nettles, American singer-songwriter
  1974   – Guy Smith, English race car driver
  1974   – Kenichi Suzumura, Japanese voice actor and singer-songwriter
  1974   – Nuno Valente, Portuguese footballer and coach
1975 – Luis Castillo, Dominican baseball player
  1975   – Bill Kirby, Australian swimmer and coach
1976 – Maciej Żurawski, Polish footballer
1977 – Nathan Bracken, Australian cricketer
  1977   – Grant Denyer, Australian race car driver and journalist
  1977   – Jeff Irwin, American singer-songwriter and producer
  1977   – David Thompson, English footballer
1978 – Elisabetta Canalis, Italian model and actress
  1978   – Benjamin McKenzie, American actor
  1978   – Ruben Studdard, American R&B, pop, and gospel singer
1980 – Sean Burroughs, American baseball player
  1980   – Fernando César de Souza, Brazilian footballer
  1980   – Yao Ming, Chinese basketball player
  1980   – Hiroyuki Sawano, Japanese composer
  1980   – Kevin Sinfield, English rugby player
  1980   – Josef Vašíček, Czech ice hockey player (d. 2011)
1981 – Marty Adams, Canadian actor and screenwriter
  1981   – Alan Arruda, Brazilian footballer
  1981   – Jennifer Hudson, American singer and actress
  1981   – Staciana Stitts, American swimmer
1982 – Zoran Planinić, Croatian basketball player
  1982   – Sal Rinauro, American wrestler
1983 – Tom Geißler, German footballer
  1983   – Rami Haikal, Jordanian guitarist
  1983   – Sebastian Hofmann, German footballer
  1983   – Daniel Muir, American football player
  1983   – Sergio Parisse, Argentinian-Italian rugby player
  1983   – Clayton Richard, American baseball player
  1983   – Carly Smithson, Irish singer-songwriter
1984 – Nashat Akram, Iraqi footballer
  1984   – Chelsea Carey, Canadian curler
1986 – Kamila Chudzik, Polish heptathlete
  1986   – Akwasi Fobi-Edusei, English footballer
  1986   – Joanne Jackson, English swimmer
  1986   – Yuto Nagatomo, Japanese footballer
  1986   – Dimitrios Regas, Greek sprinter
  1986   – Alfie Allen, English actor
  1986   – Emmy Rossum, American singer and actress
1988 – Amanda Jenssen, Swedish singer-songwriter and guitarist
1989 – Freddie Freeman, American-Canadian baseball player
  1989   – Andrew Luck, American football player
1991 – Thomas Meunier, Belgian footballer
  1991   – Mike Towell, Scottish professional boxer (d. 2016)
  1991   – Scott Wootton, English footballer
1992 – Sviatlana Pirazhenka, Belarusian tennis player
1994 – Gideon Jung, German footballer
  1994   – RM, South Korean rapper, songwriter and record producer
  1994   – Elina Svitolina, Ukrainian tennis player
1995 – Steven Gardiner, Bahamian sprinter
1997 – Sydney Sweeney, American actress
  1997   – Almida de Val, Swedish curler

Deaths

Pre-1600
 640 – Sak K'uk', Mayan queen
 973 – Nefingus, bishop of Angers
1185 – Andronikos I Komnenos, Byzantine emperor (b. 1118)
1213 – Peter II of Aragon (b. 1174)
1362 – Pope Innocent VI (b. 1295)
1368 – Blanche of Lancaster (b. 1345/1347)
1439 – Sidi El Houari, Algerian imam (b. 1350)
1500 – Albert III, Duke of Saxony (b. 1443)
1544 – Clément Marot, French poet (b. 1496)

1601–1900
1612 – Vasili IV of Russia (b. 1552)
1642 – Henri Coiffier de Ruzé, Marquis of Cinq-Mars, French conspirator (b. 1620)
1660 – Jacob Cats, Dutch poet, jurist, and politician (b. 1577)
1665 – Jean Bolland, Belgian priest and hagiographer (b. 1596)
1672 – Tanneguy Le Fèvre, French scholar and author (b. 1615)
1674 – Nicolaes Tulp, Dutch anatomist and politician (b. 1593)
1683 – Afonso VI of Portugal (b. 1643)
1712 – Jan van der Heyden, Dutch painter and illustrator (b. 1637)
1764 – Jean-Philippe Rameau, French composer and theorist (b. 1683)
1779 – Richard Grenville-Temple, 2nd Earl Temple, English politician, Lord Lieutenant of Buckinghamshire (b. 1711)
1810 – Sir Francis Baring, 1st Baronet, English banker and politician (b. 1740)
1814 – Robert Ross, Irish general (b. 1766)
1819 – Gebhard Leberecht von Blücher, Prussian general (b. 1742)
1836 – Christian Dietrich Grabbe, German playwright (b. 1801)
1869 – Peter Mark Roget, English physician, theologian, and lexicographer (b. 1779)
1870 – Eleanora Atherton, English philanthropist (b. 1782)
  1870   – Fitz Hugh Ludlow, American journalist, explorer, and author (b. 1836)
1874 – François Guizot, French historian and politician, 22nd Prime Minister of France (b. 1787)

1901–present
1903 – Duncan Gillies, Scottish-Australian businessman and politician, 14th Premier of Victoria (b. 1834)
1907 – Ilia Chavchavadze, Georgian poet, journalist, and lawyer (b. 1837)
1912 – Pierre-Hector Coullié, French cardinal (b. 1829)
1918 – George Reid, Australian accountant and politician, 4th Prime Minister of Australia (b. 1845)
1919 – Leonid Andreyev, Russian author and playwright (b. 1871)
1923 – Jules Violle, French physicist and academic (b. 1841)
1927 – Sarah Frances Whiting, American physicist and astronomer (b. 1847)
1942 – Valentine Baker, Welsh co-founder of the Martin-Baker Aircraft Company (b. 1888)
1945 – Hajime Sugiyama, Japanese field marshal and politician, 44th Japanese Minister of War  (b. 1880)
1949 – Erik Adolf von Willebrand, Finnish physician (b. 1870)
1953 – James Hamilton, 3rd Duke of Abercorn, English politician, Governor of Northern Ireland (b. 1869)
  1953   – Hugo Schmeisser, German engineer (b. 1884)
  1953   – Lewis Stone, American actor (b. 1879)
1956 – Sándor Festetics, Hungarian politician, Hungarian Minister of War (b. 1882)
1961 – Carl Hermann, German physicist and academic (b. 1898)
1962 – Spot Poles, American baseball player and soldier (b. 1887)
  1962   – Rangeya Raghav, Indian author and playwright (b. 1923)
1967 – Vladimir Bartol, Italian-Slovene author and playwright (b. 1903)
1968 – Tommy Armour, Scottish-American golfer and journalist (b. 1894)
1971 – Walter Egan, American golfer (b. 1881)
1972 – William Boyd, American actor and producer (b. 1895)
1977 – Steve Biko, South African activist (b. 1946)
  1977   – Les Haylen, Australian journalist and politician (b. 1898)
  1977   – Robert Lowell, American poet (b. 1917)
1978 – William Hudson, New Zealand-Australian engineer (b. 1896)
1981 – Eugenio Montale, Italian writer, Nobel Prize laureate (b. 1896)
1982 – Federico Moreno Torroba, Spanish composer and conductor (b. 1891)
1986 – Jacques Henri Lartigue, French painter and photographer (b. 1894)
  1986   – Charlotte Wolff, German-English psychotherapist and physician (b. 1897)
1987 – John Qualen, Canadian-American actor (b. 1899)
1990 – Athene Seyler, English actress (b. 1889)
1991 – Bruce Matthews, Canadian general and businessman (b. 1909)
1992 – Ruth Nelson, American actress
  1992   – Anthony Perkins, American actor, singer, and director (b. 1932)
1993 – Raymond Burr, Canadian-American actor and director (b. 1917)
1994 – Tom Ewell, American actor (b. 1909)
  1994   – Boris Yegorov, Russian physician and astronaut (b. 1937)
1995 – Jeremy Brett, English actor (b. 1933)
  1995   – Yasutomo Nagai, Japanese motorcycle racer (b. 1965)
1996 – Ernesto Geisel, Brazilian general and politician, 29th President of Brazil (b. 1907)
1997 – Judith Merril, American-Canadian science fiction writer, editor and political activist (b. 1923)
1999 – Bill Quackenbush, Canadian-American ice hockey player and coach (b. 1922)
2000 – Stanley Turrentine, American saxophonist, composer, and bandleader (b. 1934)
2003 – Johnny Cash, American singer-songwriter, guitarist, and actor (b. 1932)
2005 – Serge Lang, French-American mathematician, author and academic (b. 1927)
2007 – Bobby Byrd, American singer-songwriter and producer  (b. 1934)
2008 – Bob Quinn, Australian footballer and coach (b. 1915)
  2008   – David Foster Wallace, American novelist, short story writer, and essayist (b. 1962)
2009 – Norman Borlaug, American agronomist and humanitarian, Nobel Prize laureate (b. 1914)
  2009   – Jack Kramer, American tennis player and sportscaster (b. 1921)
  2009   – Willy Ronis, French photographer and author (b. 1910)
2010 – Claude Chabrol, French actor, director, producer, and screenwriter (b. 1930)
  2010   – Giulio Zignoli, Italian footballer (b. 1946)
2011 – Alexander Galimov, Russian ice hockey player (b. 1985)
2012 – Arkadii Dragomoshchenko, Russian poet and author (b. 1946)
  2012   – Jon Finlayson, Australian actor and screenwriter (b. 1938)
  2012   – Derek Jameson, English journalist and broadcaster (b. 1929)
  2012   – Tom Sims, American skateboarder and snowboarder, founded Sims Snowboards (b. 1950)
2013 – Ray Dolby, American engineer and businessman, founded Dolby Laboratories (b. 1933)
  2013   – Warren Giese, American football player, coach, and politician (b. 1924)
  2013   – Erich Loest, German author and screenwriter (b. 1926)
  2013   – Candace Pert, American neuroscientist and pharmacologist (b. 1946)
2014 – Atef Ebeid, Egyptian academic and politician, 47th Prime Minister of Egypt (b. 1932)
  2014   – John Gustafson, English singer-songwriter and bass player (b. 1942)
  2014   – Ian Paisley, Northern Irish evangelical pastor (Free Presbyterian Church) and politician, 2nd First Minister of Northern Ireland (b. 1926)
  2014   – Joe Sample, American pianist and composer (b. 1939)
  2014   – Hugh Royer, Jr., American golfer (b. 1936)
2015 – Claudia Card, American philosopher and academic (b. 1940)
  2015   – Frank D. Gilroy, American playwright and screenwriter (b. 1925)
  2015   – Al Monchak, American baseball player and coach (b. 1917)
  2015   – Aronda Nyakairima, Ugandan general and politician (b. 1959)
2017 – Allan MacEachen, Canadian economist and politician, Deputy Prime Minister of Canada (b. 1921)
  2017   – Edith Windsor, American LGBT rights activist and technology manager at IBM (b. 1929)
2018 – Shen Chun-shan, Taiwanese academic (b. 1932)
2019 – ʻAkilisi Pōhiva, Tongan politician and activist, Prime Minister of Tonga (b. 1941)

Holidays and observances
 Christian feast day:
 Ailbe (Elvis, Eilfyw) of Emly
 Ebontius
 Guy of Anderlecht
 The Most Holy Name of the Blessed Virgin Mary
 John Henry Hobart (Episcopal Church (USA))
 Laisrén mac Nad Froích
 Sacerdos of Lyon
 September 12 (Eastern Orthodox liturgics)
 Commemoration of the mass hanging of the Saint Patrick's Battalion (Mexico)
 Day of Conception (Russia)
 Defenders Day (Maryland, United States)
 Enkutatash falls on this day if it is a leap year. Celebrated on the first day of Mäskäräm. (Ethiopia, Eritrea, Rastafari)
 Nayrouz (Coptic Orthodox Church) (leap years only, September 11 on normal years) 
 National Day (Cape Verde)
 National Day of Encouragement (United States)
 Saragarhi Day (Sikhism)
 United Nations Day for South-South Cooperation (International)

References

External links

 
 
 

Days of the year
September